Lillian Davis Roberts (born January 2, 1928) served from 2002 through 2014 as the executive director of District Council 37 (DC37), the largest municipal union in New York City.

Roberts was a nurse's aide, and was secretary of the University of Chicago Hospital local when she was invited by Victor Gotbaum to join his AFSCME union staff in Chicago in 1959. This began a professional relationship between Gotbaum and Roberts that lasted for decades. When Gotbaum became head of DC37, Roberts joined him in New York as a director of hospital field operations, and eventually became Associate Director in charge of organization. In 1969, she was jailed for two weeks for defying New York Governor Nelson Rockefeller and leading a strike against three mental hospitals.

In 1981, after events which decreased her power in DC37, she left the union and was appointed as New York State industrial commissioner, the first black woman to hold such a high post in New York. From 1987 to 1992, she was senior vice president of Total Health Systems, an HMO. DC37 was involved in a major scandal in the late 1990s, and Roberts' return to DC37 as executive director in 2002 was seen, as noted in Roberts' words, as a return to that "old time religion". She retired at the end of 2014 and was succeeded by her associate Henry Garrido.

References

External links
 Photos and Archives related to Lillian Roberts. Walter P. Reuther Library of Labor and Urban Affairs. Wayne State University.
 Lillian Roberts at CUNY Graduate Center's Activist Women's Voices oral history project – finding aid

1928 births
Living people
University of Chicago staff
American trade union leaders
People from Chicago
African-American activists
Delta Sigma Theta members
Activist Women's Voices oral history project
Activists from New York City
American Federation of State, County and Municipal Employees people
20th-century African-American women
21st-century African-American people
21st-century African-American women